The Kapinawâ are an indigenous people of Buíque, Pernambuco in eastern Brazil.

In addition to their primary residence in Buíque, they are also found in Tupanatinga and Ibimirim municipalities.

Language

The Kapinawa are monolingual in Portuguese. Their original language is unattested and cannot be shown to have been distinct from neighboring languages.

References

Sources
Alain Fabre, 2005, Diccionario etnolingüístico y guía bibliográfica de los pueblos indígenas sudamericanos: KAPINAWÂ.

Unclassified languages of South America
Indigenous languages of Northeastern Brazil